Moeneeb Abbas (born 22 January 1983) is a South African cricketer, who played for Western Province in first-class, List A and Twenty20 cricket.

References 

Living people
1983 births
South African cricketers